Tolbazikha is a rural locality (a settlement) in Kabansky District, Republic of Buryatia, Russia. The population was 28 as of 2010. There is 1 street.

Geography 
Tolbazikha is located 163 km southwest of Kabansk (the district's administrative centre) by road. Vydrino is the nearest rural locality.

References 

Rural localities in Kabansky District
Populated places on Lake Baikal